The 2016–17 Dominica Premier League was the 52nd season of the Dominica Premier League, the top tier of association football in Dominica. The season was contested by 10 teams, and began on 28 August 2016 and concluded on 19 February 2017. 

Dublanc were the league champions, winning the title on the penultimate match day of the season thanks to 3-0 win over Kensbro. It was the club's fourth ever title, and their third consecutive title.

Teams 
There were 10 clubs that competed during the season. All matches were played at Windsor Park in Roseau.

Table

References 

Dominica Premiere League seasons
Dominica
football
football